Thomas Kevin Layne (born November 2, 1984) is an American former professional baseball pitcher. He previously pitched for the San Diego Padres, Boston Red Sox, and New York Yankees of Major League Baseball.

Amateur career
Layne attended Fort Zumwalt South High School in St. Peters, Missouri, where he played baseball and soccer. He then enrolled at Southwestern Illinois College where he played college baseball for two years.  He then played at the University of Central Missouri for one year before transferring to Mount Olive College in Mount Olive, North Carolina, where he played for the Mount Olive Trojans. In 2007, Layne was named an All-American and Carolinas-Virginia Athletic Conference Baseball Pitcher of the Year.

Professional career

Arizona Diamondbacks
The Arizona Diamondbacks drafted Layne in the 26th round of the 2007 MLB Draft. Layne progressed steadily up the minor league ladder over five seasons in the Diamondbacks' system and was promoted to the Triple-A Reno Aces in early 2011. Over three seasons, Layne had posted a 3.82 earned run average (ERA) working exclusively as a starter in Double-A for the Diamondbacks,  but struggled in his time at Triple-A, accumulating a 6.21 ERA in 15 games started and 17 relief appearances in 2011.

San Diego Padres
The San Diego Padres acquired Layne from the Diamondbacks on May 3, 2012, for cash considerations. Layne made 5 starts and notched a 7.77 ERA for the Triple-A Tucson Padres before he was demoted to the Double-A San Antonio Missions and began working out of the bullpen.  Layne was noted as having a "rubber arm" and he enjoyed having the chance to pitch every day, so he welcomed the transition to a reliever role. Layne had more success at Double-A, posting a 3.28 ERA and 36 strikeouts in 35 innings.

The Padres promoted Layne to the major leagues on August 14.  Layne made his Major League debut the same night against the Atlanta Braves, striking out the side in his one inning.  Layne remained with the Padres for the rest of 2012, working out of the bullpen.  He didn't allow a run in his first 11 appearances.  Layne earned his first win as a Major Leaguer on September 4 when he struck out Adrián González, Matt Kemp, and Hanley Ramírez in order in the 10th inning.  Layne finished the season with a 3.24 ERA and 25 strike-outs versus 3 walks in 16 innings over 26 appearances. Layne was designated for assignment on October 25, 2013.

Boston Red Sox
Layne signed a minor league deal with the Boston Red Sox on November 10, 2013. He was called up for the night game of a day-night doubleheader against the Baltimore Orioles on July 5, 2014. After the game, he was optioned to the Triple A Pawtucket Red Sox.  As a result of a number of trades at the 2014 trade deadline, Layne was recalled back to the Boston Red Sox.

In 2016, Layne pitched to a 3.77 ERA in 34 games for the Red Sox. After they acquired Fernando Abad at the trade deadline, the Red Sox designated Layne for assignment on August 2 and released him on August 6.

New York Yankees
The New York Yankees signed Layne on August 9, 2016. He was designated for assignment on June 10, 2017 and released on July 4, 2017.

Los Angeles Dodgers
Layne signed a minor league contract with the Los Angeles Dodgers on July 19, 2017, and was assigned to the Triple-A Oklahoma City Dodgers. He pitched in three games for them and was released on August 1.

Boston Red Sox
Layne signed a minor league contract to return to the Red Sox on February 24, 2018. He was released on May 18, 2018, after failing to make an appearance in a game due to recovery from an injury.

St. Louis Cardinals
On June 15, 2018, Layne signed a minor league contract with the St. Louis Cardinals. He elected free agency on November 2, 2018. He resigned a minor league deal on November 6, 2018. Layne was released on July 3, 2019.

Personal life
Layne is the youngest of four brothers.  He currently resides in Rye, New York.

References

External links

1984 births
Living people
Baseball players from St. Louis
Major League Baseball pitchers
San Diego Padres players
Boston Red Sox players
New York Yankees players
Mount Olive Trojans baseball players
Missoula Osprey players
South Bend Silver Hawks players
Mobile BayBears players
Visalia Rawhide players
Scottsdale Scorpions players
Criollos de Caguas players
Leones de Ponce players
Reno Aces players
Tucson Padres players
San Antonio Missions players
Pawtucket Red Sox players
Scranton/Wilkes-Barre RailRiders players
People from St. Peters, Missouri
2017 World Baseball Classic players
Oklahoma City Dodgers players
Memphis Redbirds players
Liga de Béisbol Profesional Roberto Clemente pitchers